The 1959 Titleholders Championship was contested from March 12–15 at Augusta Country Club. It was the 20th edition of the Titleholders Championship.

This event was won by Louise Suggs.

Final leaderboard

External links
Sarasota Herald-Tribune source
Daytona Beach Sunday News source

Titleholders Championship
Golf in Georgia (U.S. state)
Titleholders Championship
Titleholders Championship
Titleholders Championship
Titleholders Championship
Women's sports in Georgia (U.S. state)